Der Kaiser von Kalifornien (English: The Emperor of California), is a 1936 film that was the first western film made in Nazi Germany. Some exterior scenes were shot on location in the United States at Sedona, Arizona, the Grand Canyon  and at Death Valley in California.

Plot
The film follows the life story of Johann Augustus Sutter, the owner of Sutter's Mill, famous as the birthplace of the great California Gold Rush of 1849. However much of the story re-writes the actual history of Sutter. While the basic story of Sutter's life is retained, the producers inserted some notable changes reflecting the political environment of the film's creation: though Sutter was a Swiss-German, the film emphasizes his German ethnicity, and though he changed his name to John when he came to the United States, throughout the film he retains the name Johann.

The film opposes the "easy" money of gold-digging with the wealth and values created by hard work, as the gold rush eventually destroys Sutter's fortunes and creates social disintegration and the loss of solidarity and companionship.

In the final scene the aged and impoverished Sutter is shown in Washington, D.C., where he has a vision of America's future industrial might, seeing a land full of skyscrapers and factories.

Unlike most American Westerns of the 1930s, The Emperor of California offers a sympathetic portrait of the Native Americans, whom Sutter respectfully befriends. In this it follows the Karl May tradition of German Western stories, which often featured noble Native Americans and German immigrants turned pioneers and gunmen.

Production
The film was loosely based on the book L'Or (1925) by Blaise Cendrars. The screenplay was written and directed by the Tyrolean Luis Trenker, who also starred as Johann Sutter. Trenker had previously directed Der verlorene Sohn (The Prodigal Son, 1934), the story of an Alpine immigrant in New York City, which is the only other film produced in Nazi Germany with scenes photographed on location in the United States.

Awards and honors
The film won the 1936 Mussolini Cup for best foreign film at the Venice Film Festival. It was screened as part of the "Venice Days" series at the 68th Venice International Film Festival in September 2011.

When the film was released in Germany, Hitler attended the premier. When the film was released in the United States, The New York Times gave it a positive review on May 8, 1937 however it never reached any commercial success.

Cast
 Luis Trenker as Johann August Sutter
 Viktoria von Ballasko as Anna, his wife
 Werner Kunig as Rudolf, their son
 Karli Zwingmann as Emil, their son
 Elise Aulinger as Frau Dübol, Anna's mother
 Bernhard Minetti as a stranger
 Hans Zesch-Ballot as Governor Alvaredo
 Marcella Albani as Alvaredo's wife
 Walter Franck as Castro, Alvaredo's adjutant
 Reinhold Pasch as Marshall (as Reginald Pasch)
 August Eichhorn as Harper
 Luis Gerold as a laborer
 Paul Verhoeven as Billy, a barman
 Melanie Horeschowsky as Amalie, Sutter's sister (as Melanie Horeschovsky)
 Berta Drews as a singer
 Alexander Golling as Kewen, the mayor of San Francisco
 Heinrich Marlow as Judge Thompson
 Rudolf Klein-Rogge as a banker
 Otto Stoeckel as a banker (as Otto Stockel)
 Bruno Ziener as a banker
 Josef Reithofer as a police officer
 Jakob Sinn as a police officer
 Erich Dunskus as Smith, a casino owner
 Armin Schweizer as a coachman

See also 
 List of films made in the Third Reich
 Nazism and cinema
 Sutter's Gold (1936) film

References

External links
 

1936 films
Films of Nazi Germany
John Sutter
Films directed by Luis Trenker
1930s biographical films
1936 Western (genre) films
German biographical films
German epic films
German Western (genre) films
Films about the California Gold Rush
Films set in California
Films shot in California
Films shot in Arizona
Films set in the 1840s
German black-and-white films
1930s historical films
German historical films
Tobis Film films
1930s German-language films
Western (genre) epic films
1930s German films